North Monaghan by-election may refer to:

 1886 North Monaghan by-election
 1900 North Monaghan by-election
 1907 North Monaghan by-election